Alena Vostrá (May 17, 1938, Prague – April 15, 1992, Prague) was a Czech novelist. One of her most popular works was A Matter of Days.

She was born as Rozená Obdržálková in Prague and in 1956, after graduating from the high school, studied engineering at Czech Technical University in Prague for two semesters, then stopped and started her studies at the Theatre Faculty of the Academy of Performing Arts in Prague (DAMU). In 1960, she was expelled for "individualism", but she was eventually allowed to continue with her studies. In 1962, she started to specialize in dramaturgy. In 1963, she married the author Jaroslav Vostrý. Vostrá started to publish in 1963. She graduated in 1966.

Alena Vostrá wrote mainly theater pieces and screenplays, as well as fiction and fairy tales for children. In the theater pieces, her characters often encounter the grotesque reality of life. In prose, she often underlines connections between seemingly unimportant things.

Bibliography

Novels 
Na koho to slovo padne
Vodní bubláček Tarabka
Kdo nevěří, ať tam jede
Na ostří nože
Výbuch bude v šest (2009)
Tanec na ledě
Vsema ctyrma ocima
Co dělá vítr, když nefouká
Pepibubu
Vlažná vlna
Médium
Bůh z reklamy
Kouzelný oblázek
U nás ve Švandaluzii
Benedikt Sluhou Barona Prasila
Kdo nevěří, ať tam jede

References 

1938 births
1992 deaths
20th-century Czech writers
20th-century Czech women writers
Czech children's writers
Czech Technical University in Prague alumni
Czech screenwriters
Czech dramatists and playwrights
Dramaturges